Topgallant may refer to:
Topgallant sail
Topgallant mast
Topgallant Islands, an island group in South Australia